Gustav Lokotar (12 October 1899 – 12 October 1969) was an Estonian sport shooter.
He was born in Kalvi Rural Municipality, Virumaa. In 1921 he graduated from a military school.

He began his shooting career in 1931 under the guidance of Johannes Siir. He won 19 medals at ISSF World Shooting Championships. He was a seven -time Estonian champion in different shooting disciplines. From 1934 to 1939 he was a member of Estonian national sport shooting team.

He is buried at Pärnamäe Cemetery, Tallinn.

References

1899 births
1969 deaths
Estonian male sport shooters
People from Viru-Nigula Parish
Burials at Pärnamäe Cemetery